The Frank Pisar Farmstead, also known as Joseph Kastanek Farm, is a house and a group of farm buildings in Dorchester, Nebraska, United States. The property was filed in 1872 by Frantisek "Frank" Pisar, an immigrant from Bohemia. A stone house was built in 1977, and a stone barn in 1888. The property also includes poultry sheds, a hog house, a corncrib, and a privy. It was listed on the National Register of Historic Places on August 6, 1986.

References

External links
 
 

Buildings and structures in Saline County, Nebraska
Czech-American culture in Nebraska
Farms on the National Register of Historic Places in Nebraska
National Register of Historic Places in Saline County, Nebraska